Stephanie Kifowit (born November 2, 1971) is the Illinois state representative for the 84th district, which includes all or parts of Aurora, Boulder Hill, Montgomery, Naperville, and Oswego. Kifowit is a veteran of the U.S. Marine Corps, a former substitute teacher, and previously served as an alderman in the city of Aurora. She is currently serving on the Healthcare Licensing, Financial Institutions, Intermodal Transportation, General Services Appropriation – Vice Chairman, and Business Growth Committees for the 99th General Assembly.

Kifowit graduated with a Bachelor of Science in political science and a Masters of Public Administration from Northern Illinois University.

In 2018, Kifowit was appointed to Governor-elect J.B. Pritzker's transition committee on Veterans Affairs.

As of July 3, 2022, Representative Kifowit is a member of the following Illinois House committees:

 Appropriations - General Service Committee (HAPG)
 Income Tax Subcommittee (HREF-INTX)
 (Chairwoman of) Operations Subcommittee (HSGA-OPER)
 (Chairwoman of) Procurement Subcommittee (HSGA-PROC)
 Public Utilities Committee (HPUB)
 Revenue & Finance Committee (HREF)
 (Chairwoman of) State Government Administration Committee (HSGA)
 (Chairwoman of) Veterans' Affairs Committee (HVET)
 Water Subcommittee (HPUB-WATR)

References

External links
Representative Stephanie A. Kifowit (D) 84th District at the Illinois General Assembly
Stephanie Kifowit for State Representative
Rep. Stephanie Kifowit at Illinois House Democrats

1971 births
Living people
Democratic Party members of the Illinois House of Representatives
Northern Illinois University alumni
People from Aurora, Illinois
Women state legislators in Illinois
21st-century American politicians
21st-century American women politicians